Kristian Roebuck (born 24 December 1981) is an English badminton player.

Achievements

European Junior Championships 
Boys' doubles

IBF/BWF International 
Men's doubles

Mixed doubles

References 

1981 births
Living people
English male badminton players